Zahirabad-e Pain (also Romanized as Z̧ahīrābād-e Pā’īn; also known as Ribāt-i-Bībi, Z̧ahīrābād, and Z̧ahīrābād Soflā) is a village in Azghand Rural District, Shadmehr District, Mahvelat County, Razavi Khorasan Province, Iran. At the 2006 census, its population was 220, in 57 families.

References 

Populated places in Mahvelat County